"Simpsons Already Did It" is the seventh episode of the sixth season of the American animated television series South Park and the 86th episode of the series overall. It originally aired on Comedy Central in the United States on June 26, 2002. In the episode, which continues on from the events of the previous episode "Professor Chaos," Butters thinks up a series of schemes to take over the world, but realizes that each one has already been performed on the show The Simpsons. Meanwhile, Ms. Choksondik dies and Cartman, Kyle and Stan think that they are responsible.

The episode was written by series co-creator Trey Parker and is rated TV-MA in the United States.

Plot
Cartman shows Kyle, Stan and Tweek an advertisement he found for "Sea People". Cartman imagines them to be a race similar to mermaids. He convinces everyone to chip in to buy them.

Butters, in his alter-ego persona Professor Chaos, plots to block out the sun. His assistant, Dougie/General Disarray, informs him that this mirrors a plot of Mr. Burns' from The Simpsons and Butters abandons the idea.

Cartman expectantly places the Sea People in the water, but Stan reveals that they are merely brine shrimp. The group places the shrimp in Ms. Choksondik's coffee. Ms. Choksondik later dies.

Butters decides to behead the town's central statue. A newscaster interprets Butters' vandalism as an homage to a similar incident in The Simpsons; the police are not investigating because they want the statue to remain headless as a tribute.

Learning that semen was discovered in Ms. Choksondik's stomach, the boys conclude that they killed her. Butters devises increasingly outlandish schemes, but Dougie keeps pointing out that they have already been done on The Simpsons.

Eventually, Chef explains the difference between "sea men/semen" and "Sea People", and that the brine shrimp did not kill their teacher. Cartman discovers that when the semen they recovered is added to the Sea People aquarium, it combines with the Brine Shrimp to create a race of sea people.

Butters watches every episode of The Simpsons before introducing his newest plan: a machine that replaces the centers of chocolate covered cherries with rancid mayonnaise. Before Butters can use his device, a Simpsons commercial announces that Bart will do the same thing in that night's episode. Butters snaps and hallucinates everyone as Simpsons characters.

At the Cartman household, the boys have bought more Sea People, a larger aquarium and several gallons of semen. Their Sea-Ciety evolves into an ancient Greek-esque civilization that worships Cartman.

Butters notes that the Sea-City plot is similar to that of the "Treehouse of Horror VII" short "The Genesis Tub". The boys note that The Simpsons has done everything, so worrying about that is pointless. Chef also points out that The Simpsons borrowed their ideas from a classic Twilight Zone episode, "The Little People". Butters understands and stops hallucinating. Some Sea People begin worshipping Tweek, leading to a holy war. Seconds later, they develop nuclear weapons and destroy themselves like the Futurama episode "Godfellas". While Kyle concludes war is inevitable, a distraught Cartman wonders "Why can't societies live in peace?!".

Production
"Simpsons Already Did It" was inspired by the fact that The Simpsons did in fact beat South Park to several plot concepts. In the season 4 episode "The Wacky Molestation Adventure", Cartman was supposed to block out the sun, but one writer pointed out that "The Simpsons already did it." The episode "calls out" the obvious observation that The Simpsons have realized a vast number of ideas throughout their long-lived run. Some have found a certain reciprocity to this statement, finding instances of repetitiveness in The Simpsons itself while quoting South Park.

The episode is also referenced to the fact that the Fox Broadcasting Company passed on the South Park series, as they hated the idea of the talking poo character, Mr. Hankey, being in the show and fearing that such character would tarnish their network branding. Another reason for the episode's title is that in addition to the disdain for Mr. Hankey, Trey Parker, who co-produced South Park with friend Matt Stone, said that Fox executives told them "It'll never work because adults don't want to watch a show about kids. They want to watch a show about a family", subtly implying that the show premise should be modeled around a family similar to The Simpsons in order to be successful.

The Simpsons crew has a friendly relationship with South Park, which they demonstrated several times, going as far as sending flowers to the South Park studios when South Park parodied Family Guy in the season 10 episodes "Cartoon Wars Part I" and "Part II". In 2010, The Simpsons crew congratulated South Park for reaching 200 episodes, with a message reading "Congratulations on 200 Episodes. (We Already Did It.) (Twice.)".

Soon after, in reference to the controversies and terrorist threats surrounding depictions of the Muslim prophet Muhammad in the South Park episodes "200" and "201", the chalkboard gag on that week's The Simpsons episode, "The Squirt and the Whale", read "South Park – We'd stand beside you if we weren't so scared".

South Park was parodied in a 2003 Simpsons episode, "The Bart of War", showing a scene with three of the South Park boys Stan, Kyle and Cartman drawn in Simpsons style, with Marge disapproving of Bart and Milhouse's apparent enjoyment of "cartoon violence", and the latter two contemplating about adults voicing children's characters. The 2009 Simpsons episode "O Brother, Where Bart Thou?" has Bart, Milhouse, Nelson and Ralph dressed up as, standing at the bus stop – similarly to the iconic bus stop scenes of South Park –, and Otto using the catchphrase "Oh my God! I killed Kenny!" when he hits Ralph (dressed as Kenny) driving the school bus.

Reception
The episode received generally positive reviews. Travis Pickett of IGN gave it an 8.5 rating, especially praising Trey Parker and Matt Stone for managing to contrast the episode with the actual Simpsons with themes like Cartman performing fellatio on "some guy in an alley", while respectfully paying their dues.

References

External links
 "Simpsons Already Did It" Full episode at South Park Studios
 

South Park (season 6) episodes
Works based on The Simpsons